Simou is a village in the Paphos District of Cyprus, located 5 km northwest of Fyti. A mountainous settlement of Cyprus, at an altitude of 420 meters and a vineyard area with winemaking varieties, pulses, grains, citrus, almonds and olive trees, Simou constitutes a small but growing community with a few hundred inhabitants, built on the top of a valley slope of the Stavros tis Psokas river (or else Skarfou), offering a unique view to the visitor. The area combines the traditional architectural character with the stone-made structures and the winding streets in the village's old core, while ultra-modern dwellings have been erected around its perimeter. The community has existed since Byzantine times under the same name, which it obtain from Simos or Simonas, a settler or landowner of the region or, according to other sources, one of the Apostles of Christ. However, there are also indications that in the wider area there was an archaeological site in which objects dating back to Prehistoric times had been found it is a lovely village and would be appealing to many English tourists. This village is also home to trees called the tremithas. One tree is said to be the oldest tree in Cyprus.

References

Communities in Paphos District